Montenegrin Water Polo Cup (Montenegrin: Crnogorski vaterpolski kup) is a national water polo cup played in Montenegro. It is organized by the Water Polo and Swimming Federation of Montenegro.

History

Montenegrin clubs in Yugoslav Cup
Before Montenegrin independence, clubs from that Republic played in national water polo Yugoslav Cup and Cup of Serbia and Montenegro]]. Most successful was PVK Jadran with three trophies won. VK Primorac won two Yugoslav cups.
Below is a list of Yugoslav Cup trophies won by Montenegrin clubs.

Montenegrin Cup (2006-)
Except Montenegrin First League of Water Polo as a top-tier league competition, after the independence, Water polo Federation of Montenegro established Montenegrin Cup as a second elite national tournament. Inaugural season of Montenegrin Cup was 2006-07, and by now most successful was PVK Jadran with 12 titles (15 including Yugoslav Cup trophies). Except them, trophy of Montenegrin Cup, during the history, won VK Primorac and VK Budva.
From season 2016-17, there is a final-four tournament in Montenegrin Cup. Since then, three times the host of final four tournament was Nikšić and once Podgorica.

Winners and finals

Season by season
Below is a list of final matches of Montenegrin Cup since the season 2006-07.

Titles by Club

Montenegrin Cup 
Below is a list of clubs with titles won in Montenegrin Water Polo Cup.

Overall 
Below is an overall list, with titles won in Montenegrin Cup and SFR Yugoslavia / Serbia and Montenegro Cup.

Source:

See also
 Montenegrin First League of Water Polo
 Montenegrin Second League of Water Polo

References

External links 
Water Polo and Swimming Federation of Montenegro

Cup